Djursten is a Swedish lighthouse located at Västerbyn on the west side of the island of Gräsö in the northern Roslagens archipelago. 
The nearest community is Öregrund.

History

The location has had a lighthouse since 1767. The first lighthouse built to guide sailors from Öregrund was a stone tower topped by a charcoal fire in an iron pot. 
In 1809 the ship Bellona ran hard aground outside Djursten.

The lighthouse was replaced by a new tower built in 1839, which still stands on the site. 
The current lighthouse was at first equipped with an oil lamp and parabolic mirrors that focused the light. 
In the 1870s a kerosene lamp was installed.
The lighthouse became a state monument in 1935.
In 1945 the lighthouse was finally electrified. It was occupied until the 1960s.

Status

Today Djursten holds a small modern light visible for 11 nautical miles mounted outside the original lighthouse lantern.

Gallery

See also

 List of lighthouses and lightvessels in Sweden

References
Citations

Sources

External links

 Sjofartsverket 
 The Swedish Lighthouse Society

Lighthouses in Sweden